Eric Stephens may refer to:

 Eric Stephens (comics) (1909–2001), British comic strip artist
 Eric Stephens (cricketer) (1909–1983), English cricketer
 Eric John Stephens (1895–1967), Australian flying ace

See also
Eric Stevens (born 1989), American football player